Juan Francisco Pacheco (1605 – 24 May 1663) was a Roman Catholic prelate who served as Bishop of Cuenca (1653–1663) and Bishop of Córdoba (1652–1653).

Biography
Juan Francisco Pacheco was born in Rome, Italy in 1605.
On 14 October 1652, he was appointed during the papacy of Pope Innocent X as Bishop of Córdoba.
On 23 March 1653, he was consecrated bishop by Alfonso de Sanvítores de la Portilla, Bishop of Almería. 
On 6 October 1653, he was appointed during the papacy of Pope Innocent X as Bishop of Cuenca.
He served as Bishop of Cuenca until his death on 24 May 1663.

References

External links and additional sources
 (for Chronology of Bishops)
 (for Chronology of Bishops)
 (for Chronology of Bishops) 
 (for Chronology of Bishops) 

17th-century Roman Catholic bishops in Spain
Bishops appointed by Pope Innocent X
1605 births
1663 deaths